Roscoe Bolar Stephenson Jr. was born at Covington, Virginia on February 22, 1922. He attended the public schools of Alleghany County, Virginia and received both his B.A. (1943) and his J.D. (1947) from Washington and Lee University. After being admitted to the bar in 1947, he practiced law in Covington for twenty-six years. From 1952 to 1964, he served as Commonwealth's Attorney for Alleghany County. On July 12, 1973, he was elected as a judge for the Twenty-Fifth Judicial Circuit. He stayed in that position until he was elected to the Supreme Court of Virginia in February 1981. Justice Stephenson retired from active service in 1997, but continued his service to the Court as a Senior Justice until mid-2010. Justice Stephenson died on May 30, 2011 in Covington, Virginia.

References

1922 births
2011 deaths
Justices of the Supreme Court of Virginia
Virginia lawyers
Washington and Lee University School of Law alumni
People from Covington, Virginia
Virginia circuit court judges